The 1997 Catch China International was a professional non-ranking snooker tournament that took place from 17 to 20 September 1997 in Beijing, China. The tournament was the inaugural staging of the event as a non-ranking tournament, and was the first major international snooker tournament held in China. It featured a mixture of top sixteen stars and local Chinese players.

Steve Davis won the tournament by defeating Jimmy White 7–4 in the final.

Main draw

References

1997
China Open
Open (snooker)
Sports competitions in Beijing